Wendy Armoko, also known as Wendy Cagur (born May 8, 1979), is an Indonesian rapper, actor, presenter, and comedian. He  is a member of band The Cagur Band, which was formed by members of the comedy group Cagur.

Career
He began his career when he joined the comedy group Cagur in 2001.  In 2009, he starred in the film Pijat Atas Tekan Bawah, with Kiki Fatmala and Cagur. He hosted the shows Tarung Dangdut, WOWW, and @Show_Imah. He appeared on the Trans TV show Yuk Keep Smile in 2013-14.

In 2014, he was nominated in the category "Favorite Comedian" at the Panasonic Gobel Awards and the 2014 Nickelodeon Indonesia Kids' Choice Awards.

Filmography

Film

Television

TV Commercial

Awards and nominations

References

External links
 Berita di Kroscek
 

Indonesian television presenters
Indonesian women television presenters
Javanese people
Living people
1979 births
People from Jakarta